Dr. Clayton Deborah Susan Forrester is a fictional character on the television series Mystery Science Theater 3000 (MST3K).

Named for the hero of the 1953 film The War of the Worlds, Dr. Forrester was the chief mad scientist on the show from its inception in 1988 through the seventh season in 1996, and also appeared in Mystery Science Theater 3000: The Movie in 1996.  He was played by Trace Beaulieu.

Character background
Forrester originally worked with fellow "mad" Dr. Laurence Erhardt at the Gizmonic Institute, until they moved their operations to the bowels of Deep 13. He engineered the kidnapping of janitor Joel Robinson, shooting him into space on board the Satellite of Love.

According to the show's mythos, Dr. Forrester (full name: Clayton Deborah Susan Forrester, perhaps because his mother wanted a daughter; he has referred to himself as Clayton "Stonewall" Forrester and Clayton "Firebrand" Forrester) had been a mad scientist ever since his youth, when he was a member of Evilos (a mad scientist version of Webelos), where he grafted the rear end of a dog onto the rear end of a cat; he has traced his scientific ambitions back to "Oslo...I was found drunk and woozy...scratching the name "Paula Cranston" into my thigh with a nail". Other pivotal moments in his early life include a 1956 visit to "Sun Valley...[where] I was found behind the soft-serve machine, drooling over a picture of Dick Button" (since Trace Beaulieu was born in 1958, Forrester must thus be at least a decade or so older than the actor who portrayed him) and a visit to "the Ice Capades, [where] I was hot-riveting my kneecaps to Peggy Fleming's zamboni."

Forrester's high school career was typified by a series of humiliations, presumably contributing to his rather deranged personality. Frequently teased by classmates, he received a "shameful expulsion" from the Chess Club, suffered a "shameful shower incident" during his sophomore year, got rejected by the Swing Choir, was frequently victimized by book-dumpings after typing class, was forced to do power sit-ups in gym, and received "the revulsion, scorn, and rejection of all the pretty girls." At some point, he was struck by lightning, resulting in the white streak in his hair and mustache.

While earning his doctorate, Forrester took some undergraduate courses in Super-Villainry, and at some point he joined the Fraternal Order of Mad Science. He was a frequent attendee of the Mad Scientist Convention, although he lost the convention's invention contest each year (on one occasion his entry, "the More Painful Mouse Trap", was met only with laughter). In response to his rejections, he has blown up the convention center twice and once used incendiaries to not "actually make the building blow up, it just made it burn...really quickly".

While working at Gizmonic Institute, Forrester and his assistant, (Dr. Laurence Earhardt from K-01 to the end of Season One, at which point he was replaced by TV's Frank without explanation) sent Joel cheesy movies which he was forced to watch, in order to find a movie that would drive people mad and allow him to take over the world. In response, Joel built several robot friends to keep him company, and keep himself from being driven mad. Joel, Crow T. Robot, and Tom Servo mocked each of the movies they were forced to watch. During Joel's time on MST3K, Forrester participated in Invention Exchanges with Joel and the 'bots. He would show his invention, then Joel would show his invention.

At the end of the sixth season, Frank was assumed into Second Banana Heaven by the angel Torgo the White, an event that, surprisingly, deeply saddened Forrester, reacting as though he had lost his best friend, even lamenting Frank's loss with the song "Who Will I Kill?" In the seventh season, Pearl Forrester (Mary Jo Pehl) joined her son Clayton to help him out. When Trace Beaulieu left the series, she took over as the head mad, and continued sending bad movies to hapless temp Mike Nelson (played by Michael J. Nelson, who had replaced Joel halfway through the 5th season) and the 'bots until the original series end in 1999.

Demise
Clayton's last appearance was Laserblast (Episode #706), where he announces that his funding has been cut, causing him to pack up Deep 13 and cut loose the Satellite of Love. The end of the episode is a parody of 2001: A Space Odyssey, in which an old Clayton tries to reach a Monolith-like giant videocassette labeled "The Worst Film Ever Made". In the final scene, he is reborn as a star child. When Pearl muses about another chance to raise her son, he utters his final words of the Comedy Central series: "Oh, poopie." When he was leaving the show, Trace Beaulieu said, "It's kind of bittersweet, but it was time for me to go,".

When the show moved to the Sci Fi Channel for its eighth season and the setting changed to the future year 2525, it was revealed that although Pearl had intended to do a better job of raising Clayton the second time around, she had somehow never actually gotten around to doing so and he had grown into much the same sort of adult he was before. Pearl claims that she therefore killed him by smothering him with a pillow. Oddly enough, although Pearl would have murdered Dr. Forrester some forty years to fifty years after the events of Episode #706, when the SOL crew returned to the 20th century, it was at the same time they had left it, i.e. at the end of Episode #706, which would mean that a second Pearl and a baby Clayton were still alive at that time. However, because MST3K is "just a show" which advises its viewers to "really just relax", this was never addressed.

In 2008, Trace Beaulieu, Joel Hodgson and Frank Conniff reprised their characters for a brief DVD skit explaining the rights issues for one of the films. The skit depicted Joel and the 'bots back on the ship and Forrester (as an adult) back at the lab with Frank. It is not known where (or if) the scene fits within the show's continuity.

In Season 12, it is revealed that Dr. Forrester, along with Frank, had died sometime prior to the events of the season and their remains were recovered by Dr. Erhardt. Also, as Erhardt explains to Forrester's daughter Kinga (played by Felicia Day), her mother is Kim Cattrall. Presuming that Kinga shares the birthdate of the actress who portrays her --  June 28, 1979 -- she would have been nearly nine and a half years old as of Mystery Science Theater 3000'''s KTMA-TV debut, on November 24, 1988, further implying that Dr. Forrester and Cattrall's liaison was in the fall of 1978, perhaps while she was filming one of the various TV episodes that she appeared in during that general timeframe, although, inasmuch as Mystery Science Theater 3000'' was "just a show" whose creators advised their audience to "really just relax," the above extrapolation should by no means be considered definitive.

References

External links

Mystery Science Theater 3000 characters
Fictional mad scientists
Male characters in television
Fictional scientists in television
Television characters introduced in 1988